Gomphidius maculatus is an edible mushroom in the family Gomphidiaceae that is found in Europe and North America. It was first described scientifically by naturalist Giovanni Antonio Scopoli in 1772. Elias Magnus Fries transferred it to the genus Gomphidius in 1838, giving it the name by which it is known today. The specific epithet maculatus is derived from the Latin word for "spotted".

References

External links

Boletales
Edible fungi
Fungi described in 1772
Fungi of Europe
Fungi of North America